Brush Mountain is located in Southern California's Kern County, a little north of Ventura County. It's located in the Los Padres National Forest, a few miles west northwest of San Emigdio Mountain.

References 

San Emigdio Mountains
Mountains of Kern County, California
Los Padres National Forest
Mountains of Southern California